Annapolis (foaled April 1, 2019) is a multiple Graded stakes turf winning Thoroughbred racehorse. His Grade I wins in 2022 include the Coolmore Turf Mile Stakes at Keeneland and the Grade II Pilgrim Stakes as a two-year-old in 2021.

Background

Annapolis is a bay colt who was bred in Kentucky by Perry Bass's Bass Stables. He was sired by War Front, who became one of the most successful turf sires in the last decade who at one time had a stud fee of $250,000. Annapolis became the 100th black-type winner for his Claiborne Farm sire after his Pilgrim Stakes victory. Annapolis is the second foal out of the Graded stakes winner, GII Gazelle Stakes and GI Kentucky Oaks runner-up My Miss Sophia in 2014. The mare, a daughter of Unbridled's Song, has also produced the stakes-placed runner Nevisian Surprise and a yearling colt, both of whom are full siblings to Annapolis. My Miss Sophia was a $4 million purchase by agent Steve Young from the Lane's End consignment to the 2018 Keeneland November Breeding Stock Sale, where she was carrying Annapolis in utero.

Annapolis is owned by the racing arm of Bass Stable and is trained by U.S. Racing Hall of Fame trainer Todd Pletcher.

Racing career

2021: two-year-old season 

Annapolis debut on September 4 in a $100,000 maiden special weight on the inner turf course at Saratoga Race Course over the  -mile distance. Annapolis, starting at the odds of 6/5, closed with a strong rally after tracking eighth behind opening fractions of :24.33 and :49.68 set by I'll Figure It Out, and sailed to the lead outside the furlong marker. He kicked clear outside the sixteenth pole and drew away under steady urging from jockey Irad Ortiz Jr. to win by   lengths in a time of 1:43.47 on a firm course. Nyquest Nix was second and Ohtwoohthreefive completed the trifecta a length back. After the race Pletcher said, "He had a great turn of foot, kept going to the wire, and galloped out nicely. It was pretty much everything you could hope for in a debut."

A month later Pletcher entered Annapolis in his first stakes event, the Grade II Pilgrim Stakes at Belmont Park. Breaking from post 2 in a compact field of four, Annapolis sat second behind pacesetter Portfolio Company, who marked off splits of :24.34 for the quarter-mile and :48.96 to the half-mile. At the half-mile pole, jockey Irad Ortiz Jr. began to inch Annapolis closer to the leader and the two colts met up at the quarter pole after six furlongs in 1:12.22. The leading pair gained separation from their two competitors, Limited Liability and Doctor Jeff, —and battled gamely to the wire. Annapolis needed every inch of ground to get by a stubborn Portfolio Company, putting his head on the wire in a final time of 1:41.04 for the  miles on the firm turf.

Annapolis missed the Grade I Breeders' Cup Juvenile Turf last year when in need of surgery to have chips removed from a hind ankle.

2022: three-year-old season 

Annapolis's second start of the year was on July 4 in the Listed Manila Stakes over a mile on the Widener turf at Belmont Park. Annapolis broke from post 2 with Irad Ortiz, Jr. in the irons and settled into fourth while stablemate Chanceux set an even tempo up front, coasting through an opening quarter-mile in 23.41 seconds over the firm turf. A half-mile went in 46.14, with Boston Tea Party leading the field by a head. As the field straightened for the drive to the wire, Annapolis found a seam, with Ortiz guiding him to split rivals and display a powerful turn of foot down the center of the racetrack, leaving the others in his wake to fight for second. Annapolis was in hand at the sixteenth pole and strolled home a -length winner in a final time of 1:32.81.

On September 3, Todd Pletcher entered Annapolis in the Grade III Saranac Stakes at Saratoga. Facing a small field with three rivals Irad Ortiz Jr. led Annapolis through soft opening splits of :25, :49.79, and 1:13.65 over the firm going in the a -mile turf event for sophomores before drawing off to a comfortable -length victory in a final time of 1:42.57. Annapolis started as the 3/20 odds-on $2.30  prohibitive favorite. Pletcher said Annapolis will next face older horses for the first time in the $1 million Grade I Coolmore Turf Mile Stakes on October 8 at Keeneland, which offers a Breeders' Cup Challenge berth to the Grade I Breeders' Cup Mile. Pletcher commented after the race, "He's shown up and run well in each start of his life. We just felt like he was a colt that carries plenty of condition.  We had thought about training up to the Coolmore Turf Mile at Keeneland but decided he was doing great and probably a race in between would suit him. We (think highly of him) and feel like a mile might suit him perfectly, and so we'll see where we fit, but he's a big, strong colt physically. He seems like the type that would handle that step up in age."

In the GI Coolmore Turf Mile Stakes, Irad Ortiz Jr. positioned Annapolis third early, sitting right behind the speed in a good position. He then took command after tipping out in the stretch and drew clear by  lengths over the Brazilian-bred Ivar, the 2020 Turf Mile winner. Annapolis starting at 13/2 ran the mile on a firm course that played quickly in a stakes-record 1:33.29 gaining his fifth win and increasing his earnings to $1,166,100. The last time a three-year-old won the event was Aussie Rules in 2006. Todd Pletcher won the Coolmore Turf Mile for the second time after first capturing it in 2005 with Host when the race was sponsored by Shadwell.

Statistics

Legend:

 
 

Notes:

An (*) asterisk after the odds means Annapolis was the post-time favorite.

Pedigree

Annapolis is inbred 2s x 4d to Danzig

Annapolis is inbred 4s x 4d to Fappiano

References

2019 racehorse births
Racehorses bred in Kentucky
Racehorses trained in the United States
Thoroughbred family A5
American Grade 1 Stakes winners